Raymond V. Wilson (1870 – September 15, 1912) was an American Negro league first baseman and manager between 1896 and 1910.

Wilson debuted with the Cuban X-Giants in 1896, and was known as "the best first sacker in the game", "the king of first basemen", and "the colored Hans Wagner". He played nine seasons with the X-Giants, then finished his career with the Philadelphia Giants from 1907 to 1910. Wilson was player-manager for the X-Giants in 1905 and 1906, as well as for Philadelphia in 1909. He died in Harrisburg, Pennsylvania in 1912 at age 41 or 42.

References

External links
Baseball statistics and player information from Baseball-Reference Black Baseball Stats and Seamheads

1870 births
1912 deaths
Date of birth missing
Place of birth missing
Cuban Giants players
Cuban X-Giants players
Negro league baseball managers
Philadelphia Giants players
Baseball first basemen
Baseball players from Harrisburg, Pennsylvania
Sportspeople from Harrisburg, Pennsylvania
20th-century African-American people